Hunkpapa is a studio album by Throwing Muses, released in 1989. It peaked at number 59 on the UK Albums Chart.

Critical reception
Trouser Press called the album "a chilly and dull record that could be by any number of contempo jangle-pop bands," and said that lead singer Kristin Hersh’s voice, "no longer possessing any strong character, is ineffectual and a bit strident at times." The New York Times wrote that the band "have edged toward rock convention." The Rolling Stone Album Guide praised the "stronger sense of groove."

NME named it the 33rd best album of 1989.

Track listing

Personnel
Credits adapted from liner notes.

Throwing Muses
 Kristin Hersh – guitar, piano, vocals
 Tanya Donelly – guitar, vocals
 Leslie Langston – bass guitar, vocals
 David Narcizo – drums, percussion, vocals

Additional musicians
 Bernie Worrell – keyboards
 Russ Gershon – tenor saxophone
 Tom Halter – trumpet, flugelhorn
 Russell Jewell – trombone
 Guy Yarden – violin

Technical personnel
 Gary Smith – production
 Steve Haigler – engineering
 Matt Lane – engineering assistance
 Phil Magnotti – engineering assistance
 Greg Calbi – mastering

Charts

References

External links
 

1989 albums
Throwing Muses albums
Albums produced by Gary Smith (record producer)
4AD albums
Sire Records albums